The 2014–15 season of the Oberliga Westfalen, the highest association football league in the Westphalia region of the state of North Rhine-Westphalia, was the third season of the league at tier five (V) of the German football league system and the 33rd season overall since establishment of the league in 1978. The league was defunct from 2008 to 2012, when it was re-established.

The season began on 15 August 2014 and finished on 14 June 2015.

The champions and runners-up of the league were promoted to the Regionalliga West. Additionally the league champion also qualified directly for the first round of the 2015–16 DFB-Pokal.

League table									
The 2014–15 season saw three new clubs in the league, SuS Stadtlohn and ASC 09 Dortmund, both promoted from the Westfalenliga, while SV Lippstadt 08 had been relegated from the Regionalliga West to the league.

Top goalscorers
The top goal scorers for the season:

Promotion play-off
The runners-up of the two divisions of the Westfalenliga competed for one more spot in the Oberliga.

|}

References

External links 
  
 Oberliga Westfalen on Fupa.net 

Oberliga Westfalen
Westfalen